Hugh McMillan Dickson (8 May 1899 – 1981) was a Scottish amateur football left half who played in the Scottish League for Queen's Park.

References

1899 births
Scottish footballers
Scottish Football League players
Association football wing halves
Queen's Park F.C. players
1981 deaths
Date of death missing
Footballers from Glasgow
People from Bridgeton, Glasgow